Jennifer Chihae Moon (born 1973) is a conceptual artist and life-artist living in Los Angeles. She was born in Lafayette, Indiana and completed her bachelor's degree at UCLA and master's degree at Art Center College of Design.

After college
Moon had her first solo art exhibition in 1996 and her work was shown regularly up to 2002. After receiving a graduate degree from Art Center, Moon suffered from drug abuse and was sentenced to 18 months in the Valley State Prison for Women in 2008, following several attempted robberies. Although she made a wonderful comeback with artistic skills.

Main focus 
The interdisciplinary artist's work focuses on self-empowerment through a movement she calls "The Revolution". Moon blends queer science, self-help, fantasy, and the deeply personal through the Revolution in performances, videos, writing, and sculpture to share their unconventional vision with the world.

Publishing books 
Moon published two books in 2012 as part of an exhibition at Commonwealth and Council, a Los Angeles art exhibition space:
Principle 1 of The Revolution Definition of Abundance (2012)  and Where I Learned of Love (2012). As part of her contribution to the 2014 iteration of the Hammer Museum's Made in LA Biennial exhibition, Moon published The Book of Eros (2014).

Since 2012 Moon has had a monthly radio show on KCHUNG Radio formerly titled Adventures Within now titled Adventures With You where she covers topics such as love, body issues, race, trauma, and politics.

From 2014 to 2015 Moon installed six video cameras in her home and car that broadcast twenty four hours a day to the public space of the Equitable Life Building lobby.

Moon was the recipient of a 2013 CCF Fellowship and the Moan public recognition award at the 2014 Made in LA exhibition at the Hammer Museum.

In 2019, Moon's work "The Mooniform" was exhibited in the group show "School for Endurance Work," curated by Carole Frances Lung, at Cal State LA's Fine Arts Gallery.

Exhibitions  
Moon has exhibited venues such as: 
 China Art Objects, Los Angeles, California
 Hammer Museum, Los Angeles, California
 Cirrus Gallery, Los Angeles, California
 Gertrude Contemporary Art Spaces, Melbourne, Australia
 Commonwealth and Council, Los Angeles, California
 Transmission Gallery, Glasgow Scotland

References

External Links
 Otis College Faculty Page                          
 Goodreads
 Creative Capital
 Hammer Museum

1973 births
Living people
21st-century American women artists
Performance art in Los Angeles
American conceptual artists
Women conceptual artists
People from Lafayette, Indiana
Art Center College of Design alumni